Sennoy (masculine), Sennaya (feminine), or Sennoye (neuter) may refer to:
Sennoy Municipal Okrug, a municipal okrug of Admiralteysky District of the federal city of St. Petersburg, Russia
Sennoy, Kazakhstan, a populated place in Atyrau Region of Kazakhstan
Sennoy, Russia (Sennaya, Sennoye), several inhabited localities in Russia
Sennoy Bridge, a bridge in St. Petersburg, Russia
Sennaya Square, a square in St. Petersburg, Russia